The forest double-collared sunbird (Cinnyris fuelleborni) is a species of bird in the family Nectariniidae. It is a resident breeder of tropical moist montane forests in parts of East Africa.

Taxonomy
The forest double-collared sunbird was described by the German ornithologist Anton Reichenow in 1899 and given the binomial name Cinnyris fülleborni. He specified the type location as Kalinga in the Iringa Region of Tanzania. The specific name was chosen to honour the German physician and naturalist Friedrich Fülleborn.

This species was formerly considered as a subspecies of the eastern double-collared sunbird (Cinnyris mediocris) but was promoted to species status based on differences in plumage and genetics.

References

Forest double-collared sunbird
Forest double-collared sunbird